The 1893 South Australian Football Association season was the 17th season of the top-level Australian rules football competition in South Australia.

Medindie Football Club (nickname Dingoes), which joined the SAFA in 1888, were renamed North Adelaide Football Club on 14 March 1893, at a meeting held at Temperance Hall, North Adelaide.

The  Football Club, the first Australian rules football club in South Australia, dropped out of the SAFA and folded at the end of the season. It has no relation to the modern day  Crows.

Ladder

References 

SANFL
South Australian National Football League seasons